The Anglican Diocese of Ekiti is one of twelve within the Anglican Province of Ondo, itself one of 14 provinces within the Church of Nigeria: the current bishop is Andrew Olushola Ajayi the former Bishop of Ekiti Kwara Missionary Diocese.  

The Diocese was established on October 29, 1966 with Late Rt. Rev'd Micheal Adeniyi Osanyin as the Pioneer Bishop. The Bishop see is The Cathedral Church of Emmanuel, Okesha, Ado Ekiti. Formerly, Emmanuel Anglican Church, Ado Ekiti.

Notes

Dioceses of the Province of Ondo
 
Ekiti